Lukas Mugevičius (born December 7, 1994) is a Lithuanian professional tennis player and a member of Lithuania Davis Cup team.

Mugevičius reached his highest combined ranking of No. 81 in the world on ITF junior circuit on March 19, 2012.

Mugevičius is coached by his father Rimvydas Mugevičius.

ATP Challenger Tour and ITF Men's Circuit finals

Singles: 2 (0–2)

Doubles: 7 (5–2)

Davis Cup 
Mugevičius is a member of the Lithuania Davis Cup team, having posted a 3–5 record in singles and a 1–3 record in doubles in eight ties played.

References

External links 
 
 
 

Lithuanian male tennis players
Sportspeople from Vilnius
1994 births
Living people
21st-century Lithuanian people